The Car Keys is a 2003 French mockumentary film written, produced, directed by, and starring Laurent Baffie.

Plot
It's hard to make a good movie. Laurent Baffie understands this and takes Daniel Russo on a quirky adventure in search of the car keys he lost. In reality, his keys are in his left pocket, but all of this is just an allegory of life, friendship, and adventure. An adventure in which Baffie plays himself, while at the same time directing, screenwriting, and producing.

Cast and characters

 Laurent Baffie as Laurent
 Daniel Russo as Daniel
 Alexandra Sarramona as Lucie
 Pascal Sellem as Pascal
 Bruno Moynot as Zadko Preskovic
 Dani as The Bourgeois
 Gérard Depardieu as  Cheese maker
 Alain Chabat as Dog seller
 Michel Galabru as Teacher
 Jean-Marie Bigard as Bank director
 Mado Maurin as Woman in white
 Chantal Ladesou as Bank teller
 Chantal Lauby as clingy woman
 Claire Maurier as Old lady
 François Rollin as Marineland director
 Guillaume Canet as himself
 Marina Foïs as herself
 Régis Laspalès as himself
 Pierre Arditi as himself
 Thierry Lhermitte as himself
 Kad Merad as himself
 Olivier Baroux as himself
 Gérard Darmon as himself
 Dominique Besnehard as himself
 Elise Larnicol as herself
 Albert Dupontel as himself
 Didier Bourdon as himself
 Bernard Campan as himself
 Pascal Légitimus as himself
 Jean-Paul Rouve as himself
 Édouard Baer as himself
 Dominique Farrugia as himself
 Jacques Gamblin as himself
 Michael Youn as himself

References

External links
 
 

2003 comedy films
2003 films
French comedy films
Self-reflexive films
2000s French films